The following television stations broadcast on digital or analog channel 27 in Canada:

 CBWT-DT in Winnipeg, Manitoba
 CFMT-DT-2 in Ottawa, Ontario
 CHAU-DT-11 in Kedgwick, New Brunswick
 CHBC-DT in Kelowna, British Columbia
 CHNB-DT-3 in Moncton, New Brunswick
 CIII-DT-27 in Peterborough, Ontario
 CKVU-DT-2 in Victoria, British Columbia

27 TV stations in Canada